The  is a cluster of landmarks in Iwate Prefecture, Japan connected with the writings of Meiji period author Kenji Miyazawa in Iwate Prefecture, Japan. These locations were collectively designated a Place of Scenic Beauty in 2005.

Overview
Ihatov is the name of a fictional land derived from the word "Iwate" as a toponym created by author Kenji Miyazawa.  In the author’s works Ihatov is a utopia which ranges from small islands in vast oceans and includes deserts and continents; however, it shares a number of things on common with Iwate, including a tendency towards natural disasters, and a resilient population.

The Place of Scenic Beauty designation spanned six locations in the municipalities of Hanamaki (Miyazawa's birthplace), Ōshū, Shizukuishi, Sumita, Hanamaki Tōno and Takizawa, to which a seventh location was added in 2006. Each of the locations appears in one or more of Miyazawa's poems.

 , Takizawa
 , Shizukuishi
 , Shizukuishi
 , Hanamaki
, Hanamaki, Tōno, Ōshū
 , Ōshū, Sumida
 , Hanamaki

See also
List of Places of Scenic Beauty of Japan (Iwate)
 Kenji Miyazawa
 Esperanto

References

Geography of Iwate Prefecture
Places of Scenic Beauty
Ōshū
Shizukuishi, Iwate
Sumita, Iwate
Takizawa, Iwate
Hanamaki, Iwate
Tōno, Iwate